Daniele Giorgini and Potito Starace are the defending champions, but they decided not to participate this year.

Dino Marcan and Antonio Šančić won the title, defeating César Ramírez and Miguel Ángel Reyes-Varela in the final 6–3, 6–710–12, [12–10].

Seeds

Draw

Draw

References
 Main Draw

San Benedetto Tennis Cup - Doubles
2015 - Doubles